Jo Anna Dossett is an American educator and politician serving as a member of the Oklahoma Senate from the 35th district. Elected in November 2020, she assumed office on January 11, 2021.

Early life and education 
Dossett was born in Owasso, Oklahoma. Both of her parents were teachers. She earned a Bachelor of Arts degree in philosophy from William Jewell College and a Master of Arts from Oklahoma State University–Stillwater.

Career 
Prior to entering politics, Dossett worked as a teacher for English-learners at Owasso Public Schools. She was elected to the Oklahoma Senate in November 2020 and assumed office on January 11, 2021.

Personal life 
Dossett and her husband, Chris Barber, have two children. Her brother, J. J. Dossett, is also a member of the Oklahoma Senate.

References 

Living people
People from Owasso, Oklahoma
William Jewell College alumni
Oklahoma State University alumni
Democratic Party Oklahoma state senators
Women state legislators in Oklahoma
21st-century American women politicians
21st-century American politicians
Year of birth missing (living people)